Matthew Kugler Meigs (February 5, 1812 – October 9, 1889) was an American educator, scholar, and Presbyterian clergyman.  Although best known as the founder and principal (headmaster) of The Hill School in Pottstown, Pennsylvania, Meigs also served a short term as U.S. Consul to Piraeus, Greece, pastored churches, and preceded his time at The Hill School with teaching posts at a variety of other secondary and university level institutions including a short term as President of Delaware College (subsequently the University of Delaware).

Life
Meigs was born in Albany, New York on February 5, 1812. He was the son of Major John Meigs and grandson of Seth Meigs, a Revolutionary War soldier. He married Mary Gould on April 11, 1842. Eleven children were born to them between 1844 and 1858. Son John succeeded his father as The Hill School's headmaster, serving in that position from 1876 to 1911.

Academic studies and early career
Meigs received his undergraduate degree in languages and linguistics from Union College (1836) and theological training from  Union Theological Seminary (1839) after which he was ordained a Presbyterian Minister. Other degrees followed including a Ph.D. from Lafayette College. Various alumni journals, histories and obituaries concur that he was at some point also awarded the degrees of  D.D. (Doctor of Divinity) and L.L.D. (Doctor of Laws). Union College specifically attributes the L.L.D. to Lafayette College in 1868.

Meigs early academic career included posts at schools in South Carolina, Winchester, Virginia, and the University of Michigan. He then became a teacher and principal of Newark Academy (1846-1851) before becoming president of Delaware College (1850-1851). During his time in Michigan, he also pastored a church in Pontiac.

The Hill School and later career
Meigs' most notable legacy is in the founding of The Hill School in 1851 in Pottstown, Pennsylvania from which he retired as principal in 1876. During his tenure at The Hill, he took a brief leave of absence  from 1868-1869 to serve as U.S. Consul to Piraeus, Greece.

Meigs continued his interest in the church even after education became his primary professional focus. He and his family were active at the First Presbyterian Church in Pottstown. His obituaries attest to the respect accorded both his clerical standing in the church and his status as a scholar by describing him as a "well-known Presbyterian divine" and a "distinguished scholar and clergyman...a man of fine literary attainments, distinguished as a philologist" at the time of his death.

Death
Meigs died on October 9, 1889 in Clifton Springs, New York and was buried in Edgewood Cemetery in Pottstown.  The New York State death certificate (#36123) and local obituaries agree on October 9 as his death date.  However, the Journal of the Presbyterian Historical Society, The University of Delaware Archives, and The Union Theological Seminary Alumni Catalog give October 10 as date of death.

References

Further reading

External links
 Historical Society of Montgomery County, PA
 Hill School History
 Meigs Family History and Genealogy

1812 births
1889 deaths
Boarding schools in Pennsylvania
Union College (New York) alumni
Union Theological Seminary (New York City) alumni
Presidents of the University of Delaware
19th-century American educators
Presbyterian Church in the United States ministers
United States Foreign Service personnel
People from Pottstown, Pennsylvania
Educational institutions established in 1851
Schools in Montgomery County, Pennsylvania
American people of English descent
University of Delaware faculty
The Hill School faculty
University of Michigan faculty
American school principals
19th-century American clergy